The following television stations operate on virtual channel 43 in the United States:

 K07DI-D in Hinsdale, Montana
 K11IA-D in Glasgow, Montana
 K14NY-D in Sayre, Oklahoma
 K16LQ-D in Seiling, Oklahoma
 K19LA-D in Rocky Ford, Colorado
 K20BR-D in Gage, etc., Oklahoma
 K20MP-D in Lamar, Colorado
 K22BR-D in May, etc., Oklahoma
 K22LZ-D in Hollis, Oklahoma
 K23OU-D in Pueblo, Colorado
 K26NC-D in Elk City, Oklahoma
 K26NS-D in Fort Peck, Montana
 K27NB-D in Baton Rouge, Louisiana
 K28JX-D in Alva-Cherokee, Oklahoma
 K29HY-D in Strong City, Oklahoma
 K29HZ-D in Woodward, etc., Oklahoma
 K29NM-D in Spokane, Washington
 K31MU-D in Lingleville-Crowley, Texas
 K35MZ-D in Las Animas, Colorado
 K35OH-D in Roseburg, Oregon
 K35PK-D in Monterey, California
 K36NE-D in Las Vegas, Nevada
 K43JE-D in Lake Crystal, Minnesota
 K43JQ-D in Bismarck, North Dakota
 K43LK-D in Lawton, Oklahoma
 KAHC-LD in Sacramento, California
 KAUT-TV in Oklahoma City, Oklahoma
 KBIT-LD in Monterey, California
 KCDN-LD in Kansas City, Missouri
 KCTU-LD in Wichita, Kansas
 KEJB in El Dorado, Arkansas
 KGMC in Merced, California
 KIWB-LD in Boise, Idaho
 KLKW-LD in Amarillo, Texas
 KMBD-LD in Minneapolis, Minnesota
 KMSG-LD in Fresno, California
 KPDD-LD in Evergreen, Colorado
 KPMC-LD in Bakersfield, California
 KQAF-LD in La Junta, Colorado
 KQHD-LD in Hardin, Montana
 KRPG-LD in Des Moines, Iowa
 KRWF in Redwood Falls, Minnesota
 KSFW-LD in Dallas, Texas
 KSKT-CD in San Marcos, California
 KTMJ-CD in Topeka, Kansas
 KYHT-LD in Lake Charles, Louisiana
 W03BU-D in Matecumbe, Florida
 W16DQ-D in Tampa, Florida
 W25FH-D in Fort Wayne, Indiana
 W29FD-D in Columbus, Georgia
 W30EB-D in Kingston, Pennsylvania
 W33EM-D in Pittsburgh, Pennsylvania
 WBXJ-CD in Jacksonville, Florida
 WDGA-CD in Dalton, Georgia
 WFXB in Myrtle Beach, South Carolina
 WGIQ in Louisville, Alabama
 WGOX-LD in Mobile, Alabama
 WHFL-CD in Goldsboro, North Carolina
 WHTX-LD in Springfield, Massachusetts
 WKOI-TV in Richmond, Indiana
 WLXI in Greensboro, North Carolina
 WNXY-LD in New York, New York
 WNYS-TV in Syracuse, New York
 WPMC-CD in Mappsville, Virginia
 WPMT in York, Pennsylvania
 WSVF-CD in Harrisonburg, Virginia
 WTCN-CD in Palm Beach, Florida
 WTNZ in Knoxville, Tennessee
 WUAB in Lorain, Ohio
 WUET-LD in Savannah, Georgia
 WVBT in Virginia Beach, Virginia
 WVEN-TV in Melbourne, Florida
 WWDT-CD in Naples, Florida
 WYZZ-TV in Bloomington, Illinois
 WZME in Bridgeport, Connecticut
 WZPX-TV in Battle Creek, Michigan
 WZVI in Charlotte Amalie, U.S. Virgin Islands

The following stations, which are no longer licensed, formerly operated on virtual channel 43:
 K21NX-D in Hermiston, Washington
 K43AG-D in Edwards, California
 K43EG-D in Pitkin, Colorado
 KSEX-CD in San Diego, California
 KYAN-LD in Los Angeles, California
 W43DL-D in Montgomery, Alabama

References

43 virtual